2828 Peachtree is a  in Atlanta, Georgia. It was completed in 2002 and has 27 residential floors on top of 5 floor parking garage. Womack + Hampton L.L.C designed the building, which is the 28th tallest building in Atlanta. It has 79 units.

See also
List of tallest buildings in Atlanta
http://www.2828peachtree.com

References
Emporis
Skyscraperpage

Residential condominiums in the United States
Residential skyscrapers in Atlanta
Residential buildings completed in 2002
2002 establishments in Georgia (U.S. state)